The people listed below were all born in, residents of, or otherwise closely associated with Póvoa de Varzim, Portugal.

Saints and religion
Saint Peter of Rates (? — 60), Catholic saint; mythology
Saint Felix the Hermit (9th century?), Catholic saint; mythology
Blessed Alexandrina of Balazar (1904 — 1955), Catholic mystic
José da Sacra Família (1788 — 1858), friar and Catholic missionary
D. Joaquim Gonçalves (1936, Fafe — 2013, Póvoa de Varzim), bishop

Literature
Gomes de Amorim (1827 — 1891), poet
Eça de Queiroz (1845 — 1900), novelist
Agustina Bessa-Luís
Camilo Castelo Branco
Daniel Hompesch (1948, Liege — 2017, Póvoa de Varzim), painter

Discovery Age & imperialism
Tomé de Sousa (1503 — 1579), first general-governor of Brazil
Diogo Dias de São Pedro, captain of the Portuguese armada, liberator of Bahia, Brazil
António Cardia, Judge/Mayor of Póvoa de Varzim, liberator of Pernambuco, Brazil
Garcia d'Ávila, Bandeirante in Brazil

Ethnography and local politics
Relevant people on subjects of local importance, such as ethnographic studies, history and politics:
Cego do Maio (1817 — 1884), local hero and fisherman
António Augusto da Rocha Peixoto (1866 — 1909), naturalist and ethnologist
David José Alves (1866 — 1924), politician
António dos Santos Graça (1882 — 1956), ethnologist
Elísio Martins da Nova, radio-telegrafist of the Portuguese armada
Manuel Silva (1869 — 1941), historian
Maria da Paz Varzim,  creator of the Maria da Paz Varzim Institute

Politics and economics
Diogo Freitas do Amaral (b. 1941), politician, founder of the CDS party, former prime minister and minister
Tavares Moreira (b. 1944), economist and former president of the Bank of Portugal
Miguel Cadilhe (b. 1944), economist and former finance minister
Manuel Francisco de Almeida Brandão (1837-1902), capitalist, Portuguese Progressist party, mayor of Póvoa de Varzim

Television
Sandra Sousa, TV presenter, journalist

Sports
 Alves brothers
Bruno Alves
 Geraldo Alves (footballer, born 1980)
 Júlio Regufe Alves
Rui Costa (cyclist)
Hélder Postiga
Fábio Coentrão
Bino (footballer)
António Lima Pereira
Aurora Cunha

Povoa de Varzim